Global Action Plan is an NGO that specialises in sustainable behaviour change, and in particular in ESD. There are programmes for schools and youth, households and communities, and workplaces. The ethos is that small changes to the choices we make every day make a big difference when widely adopted.

History 

In 1989 Global Action Plan International was established in the United States and the Netherlands on the initiative of David Gershon and Bessie Schadee. The first results from a 'household EcoTeam program' were presented at the Rio Earth Summit in 1992. The programme was conceived to involve everyday people in creating solutions to environmental problems.

Structure

The Global Action Plan idea and methods spread to a number of countries. Global Action Plan International is now an international network with national and regional member organizations around the world. The member organizations are autonomous, but often collaborate on international programmes.

Members
An up-to-date list of members is provided on the web site of Global Action Plan International.

Methods and tools 
Ever since its inception, Global Action Plan International has worked in 'action research' mode to learn from experience, exploring what enables actual behaviour change. The organization's current main focus areas are the Clean Air Movement and the Compassion not Consumerism Movement. Global Action Plan frequently work alongside academic partners to produce peer-reviewed research to improve wider knowledge for the sector.

UK 
Global Action Plan UK was launched in its current form in the UK by founder and former Director, Trewin Restorick. The first UK programme engaged 30,000 households and was supported by thousands of volunteers, who participated and received action packs that offered practical tips on ways to use energy efficiently, reduce waste, cut water use in their homes and to shop ethically.

Since then new programmes have come online working with businesses, communities, hospitals and schools. In the UK they are most well known for Clean Air Day, the UK's largest air pollution campaign, and Transform our World, a quality-rated resource hub to help teachers bring environmental action into the classroom.

UK's approach 

On Global Action Plan's website they express their approach as being:

 Practical and positive - it can be hard for people to tackle overwhelming environmental issues like climate change so we break them down into small steps that everyone can take, like unplugging mobile phone chargers when they're not being used.
 Measurable - we help people to see the difference they are making by measuring the resources saved as a result of their actions and those of their community. For example, just 63 households in our Nottingham EcoTeams programme have collectively saved a massive 7 tonnes from ending up on the rubbish mountain.
 Interactive - changing habits alone is difficult. Watch a team of businessmen build a teetering tower of paper in their corporate lobby, and you'll see what's different about Global Action Plan. By supporting groups of people working together, we make taking action easier, more creative and much more fun.
 Inclusive - everyone gets switched on by different things. Working with all kinds of individuals and organisations has enabled us to come up with a range of imaginative ways to communicate. Try riding our Energy Bike for a totally different way of making the connection between energy use and climate change.

Current and previous programmes 
Global Action Plan has run many programmes designed to bring about improvements for the environment and people. Some Global Action Plan programmes include:

 Water Explorer: Free and fully resourced, the Water Explorer programme empowers future generations through fun, interactive water saving Missions and provides the platform for students to grow into global citizens and ambassadors for positive change.
 Operation TLC: helps hospitals lower bills, cut energy use, improve patient experience, and create more comfortable buildings for staff.
 Environment Champions: trains staff in corporations to run internal campaigns to change behaviour to reduce environmental impacts, for which they won an Ashden Award in 2008.
 Big Energy Race: Big Energy Race helps people take control of their bills and cut their energy costs – we want to get the nation energy-fit!
 EcoTeams: trains groups of householders to monitor their resource use and reduce over time
 Action at School: works with teachers and pupils to green their schools.
 Clean Air Day: Annual event to draw public attention to air pollution.
 Clean Air Hospital Framework (CAHF): A comprehensive plan for reducing air pollution in and around hospitals, developed in partnership with Great Ormond Street Hospital.

References

External links 
 Global Action Plan UK homepage

 Global Action Plan International homepage
 EcoTeams homepage

Environmental organisations based in England